This is a list of urban agglomerations and cities (those not included in the Urban Agglomerations), with a population above 100,000 as per 2011 census in the Indian state of Madhya Pradesh:

Urban Agglomeration
In the census of India 2011, an Urban Agglomeration has been defined as follows:

"An urban agglomeration is a continuous urban spread constituting a town and its adjoining outgrowths (OGs), or two or more physically contiguous towns together with or without outgrowths of such towns. An Urban Agglomeration must consist of at least a statutory town and its total population (i.e. all the constituents put together) should not be less than 20,000 as per the 2001 Census. In varying local conditions, there were similar other combinations which have been treated as urban agglomerations satisfying the basic condition of contiguity."

Constituents of Urban Agglomerations in Madhya Pradesh
The constituents of Urban Agglomerations in Madhya Pradesh, with a population of 1 lakh or above, are noted below:

Indore Urban Agglomeration includes  Indore (M Corp.), Bhangarh (OG), Tigaria Badshah (OG), Nipanya (OG), Talawali Chanda (OG), Kanadia (OG), Tigaria Rao (OG), Bhicholi Mardana (OG), Palda (CT), Bank (CT), Hukmakhedi (CT), Bangarda Chhota (CT), Ahirkhedi (CT), Piplya Kumar (CT), Bangarda Bada (CT), Limbodi (CT), Lasudiya Mori (CT) and Bhicholi Hapsi (CT)
Bhopal Urban Agglomeration includes Bhopal (M Corp.) and Kolar (M)
Jabalpur Urban Agglomeration includes Jabalpur (M Corp.), Regwa (OG), Khairi (OG), Rachai (OG), Lamti (OG). Tilhari (OG), Kugawan (OG), Andhuwa (OG), Chhiwlaha (OG), Bhatauli (OG), Jabalpur Cantt (CB), OF Khamaria (CT), GCF Jabalpur (CT), Bilpura (CT), Vehicle Fac Area Jabalpur (CT), Suhagi (CT), Manegoan (CT), Pipariya (CT), Karmeta (CT), Amkhera (CT), Maharajpur (CT) and Madai (CT).
Gwalior Urban Agglomeration includes Gwalior (M Corp.) and Morar Cantt (CB).
Sagar Urban Agglomeration includes  Sagar (M Corp.+OG), Sagar (M Corp.), Gaur Nagar (OG), Sagar Cantt (CB), Rajakhedi (CT), Makronia Buzurg (CT), Bhainsa (CT), Kapuria (CT)
Satna Urban Agglomeration includes  Satna (M Corp.) and Satna Rly Colony (OG).
Ratlam Urban Agglomeration includes Ratlam (M Corp.) and Ratlam Rly. Colony (Ratlam Kasba) (CT).
Chhindwara Urban Agglomeration includes  Chhindwara (M), Khajari (OG), Khapabhat (OG), Kukadajagat (OG), Chandangaon (OG), Seoni Pranmoti (OG), Emaliya Bohata (OG) and Lonia Karbal (CT).
Chhatarpur Urban Agglomeration includes Chhatarpur (M), Soura (part) (OG), Bagota (part) (OG), Moraha (part) (OG) and Amanganj (CT).
Damoh Urban Agglomeration includes  Damoh (M), Imlai (OG), Singpur Damoh (OG), Chopra Ryt (OG), Chopra Khurd (OG), Dharampura (OG) and Hirdepur (CT).
Khargone Urban Agglomeration includes  Khargone (M), Sukhpuri (OG), Dhamkheda (OG), Rahimpura (OG), Aarampura (OG), Dabariya (OG), Kajalpur (OG), Khedi Buzurg (OG), Sangvi (CT) and Jaitpur (CT).
Neemuch Urban Agglomeration includes Neemuch (M) and Rly Colony (Kumariya) (OG).
Itarsi Urban Agglomeration includes Itarsi (M), Pathrauta (part) (OG), Bhilakhedi (CT) and Meharagaon (CT).
Sehore Urban Agglomeration includes Sehore (M) and Sherpur (Vaisali Nagar) (part) (OG).

Abbreviations: M Corp. = Municipal corporation, M= Municipality, CT = Census town, OG= Out Growth, CB = Cantonment Board

Urban Agglomeration constituents
Urban Agglomerations constituents with a population above 100,000 as per 2011 census are shown in the table below.

References

Cities
Madhya Pradesh